Sparganothis boweri is a species of moth of the family Tortricidae. It is found in North America, where it has been recorded from Alberta, Colorado, Connecticut, Maine, Manitoba, Maryland, Massachusetts, Michigan,  Minnesota, New Brunswick, New Jersey, New York, Nova Scotia, Ohio, Ontario, Pennsylvania, Quebec, Saskatchewan, Wisconsin and Wyoming.

The wingspan is 18–21 mm.

References

Moths described in 2012
Sparganothis